Apache Apex is a YARN-native platform that unifies stream and batch processing. It processes big data-in-motion in a way that is scalable, performant, fault-tolerant, stateful, secure, distributed, and easily operable.

Apache Apex was named a top-level project by The Apache Software Foundation on April 25, 2016.  As of September 2019, it is no longer actively developed.

Overview
Apache Apex is developed under the Apache License 2.0. The project was driven by the San Jose, California-based start-up company DataTorrent.

There are two parts of Apache Apex: Apex Core and Apex Malhar.   Apex Core is the platform or framework for building distributed applications on Hadoop. The core Apex platform is supplemented by Malhar, a library of connector and logic functions, enabling rapid application development. These input and output operators provide templates to sources and sinks such as Alluxio, S3, HDFS, NFS, FTP, Kafka, ActiveMQ, RabbitMQ, JMS, Cassandra, MongoDB, Redis, HBase, CouchDB, generic JDBC, and other database connectors.

History
DataTorrent has developed the platform since 2012 and then decided to open source the core that became Apache Apex.  It entered incubation in August 2015 and became Apache Software Foundation top level project within 8 months. DataTorrent itself shut down in May 2018.

As of September 2019, Apache Apex is no longer being developed.

Apex Big Data World
Apex Big Data World 
is a conference about Apache Apex. The first conference of Apex Big Data World took place in 2017.  They were held in Pune, India and Mountain View, California, USA.

References

External links

Apache Software Foundation projects
Free software programmed in Java (programming language)
Apache Software Foundation
Software using the Apache license
Free system software
Distributed stream processing